Target was a Southern rock band from Memphis, Tennessee, who formed in the early 1970s. The band consisted of singer Jimi Jamison, guitarists Buddy Davis and Paul Cannon, Tommy Cathey on bass, and drummer David Spain. The group released a pair of albums for A&M Records with 3 singles. However, it has come to light (released by Scape Music in 2017) that a third album was recorded in 1979, entitled In Range before the band split in 1982.

History (1974-1980) 
In the early 1971, Jamison was playing in a band called Omaha with Roy Howell who was the songwriter, and handled the electric guitars, mandolins and mandolute, Jimi was lead vocals, and both were working with Tommy Cathey (Bass), Walter Polk (Drums), and David Mayo (Tack piano). After releasing the song "Open Mind," which was recorded, engineered and quick-mixed by J.R. Williams at Trans-Maximus (TMI) Studio in Memphis, several band members wanted to explore the chances of performing original music and ended up backing David Beaver on his Combinations project (released under the moniker D. Beaver). Eventually, they decided to break out on their own and formed Target.

Target started and became an arena local band playing live constantly to build up their reputation. Eventually they were signed by A&M Records at the High Cotton Club in Memphis on February, 1975. Their first album came the next year with the same band's title name releasing 3 singles, they cover the song "99 and Half" on their first album [originally from Sister Rosetta Tharpe and her mother (Katie Bell Nubin) with Sam Price Trio in 1949], and opened concerts for Black Sabbath, Boston, and KISS. The group went down well live, but this did not translate into the kind of record sales that had been hoped for.

The second album (Captured, 1977) saw the band's sound become a little more sophisticated and expansive, and the band went out on tour once more, playing with Boston on this occasion. However, A&M were unimpressed by the sales figures for Captured and dropped Target from their roster. Target struggled on without a record deal until the early 1980s, before finally calling it a day. They won many loyal fans over their time together, and continued to pack venues down the years whenever there was the occasional Target reunion (as in 1989).

Final Recording and Late Release 
In Range was recorded in the autumn of 1979: it took the band about two to three weeks to do this third album and it was released by Scape Music Label in 2017.

Discography

Singles

References 

American southern rock musical groups
Musical groups from Memphis, Tennessee
Rock music groups from Tennessee